Battle of Yunnan-Burma Road (Mid March – Early June 1942) was the name of the Chinese intervention to aid their British allies in the 1942 Burma Campaign. Its forces were composed of the Fifth, Sixth and Sixty-sixth Army under the command of the Chinese Expeditionary Force in Burma, commanded by Lt. General Joseph Stilwell, Lt. General Luo Zhuoying was his executive officer.

In February 1942, General Lo Cho-ying directed 5th Army to move from western Yunnan to the vicinity of Toungoo and further south in Burma.  Advanced elements of the 200th Division of 5th Army arrived at Toungoo on March 8, 1942 and took over defensive positions from the British forces. The 6th Army was directed to move from Kunming to the Burma–Thai border. Its leading elements reached Mawchi, Mong Pan and Mong Ton in mid March. The 66th Army later arrived in Lashio and Mandalay as a reserve and to assist the British forces in their operations.

Battles of the Yunnan-Burma Road Campaign 
 Battle of Tachiao March 18–19, 1942  
 Battle of Oktwin March 20–23, 1942, in vicinity of Oktwin
 Battle of Toungoo March 24–30, 1942, in and around Taungoo
 Battle of Yedashe April 5–8, 1942, in vicinity of Yedashe
 Battle of Szuwa River April 10–16, 1942, at Szuwa River northwest of Yedashe
 Battle of Mawchi and Bato Early April 1942, in vicinity of Mawchi
 Battle of Bawlake April 17, 1942, in vicinity of Bawlakhe
 Battle of Yenangyaung April 17–19, 1942
 Battle of Pyinmana April 17–20, 1942, in vicinity of Pyinmana
 Battle of Loikaw April 20, 1942, in vicinity of Loikaw
 Battle of Hopong-Taunggyi April 20–24, 1942, in vicinity of Hopong and Taunggyi 
 Battle of Loilem April 25, 1942, in vicinity of Loilem
 Battle of Lashio April 29, 1942, in vicinity of Lashio
 Battle of Hsenwe May 1, 1942
 Battle of Salween River May 6–31, 1942
 Battle of Hsipaw-Mogok Highway May 23, 1942

See also 
 China Burma India Theater of World War II (CBI)
 The 1942 Japanese advance to the Indian frontier in the Burma Campaign
 Battle of Northern Burma and Western Yunnan
 X Force and Y Force for Chinese forces which fought in the Burma Campaign

References

Sources 
 Hsu Long-hsuen and Chang Ming-kai, History of The Sino-Japanese War (1937–1945), 2nd Ed., 1971. Translated by Wen Ha-hsiung, Chung Wu Publishing; 33, 140th Lane, Tung-hwa Street, Taipei, Taiwan Republic of China.
 Jon Latimer, Burma: The Forgotten War, London: John Murray, 2004.
  Orbat of the Chinese Expeditionary Force in Burma – 1942
  Japanese forces in Burma, The 1942 Campaign
 中国抗日战争正面战场作战记 (China's Anti-Japanese War Combat Operations)
 Author : Guo Rugui, editor-in-chief Huang Yuzhang
 Press : Jiangsu People's Publishing House
 Date published : 2005-07-01
 
 第八部分：太平洋战争爆发后的中国抗战中国远征军入缅援英作战 1 (The Chinese Expeditionary Force enters Burma to help England to fight)

External links 
 Map of Burma in World War II Showing railroads, roads and tracks.
 Topographic Maps of the battlefield area
 Topographic Map  NE 47-1 Pyinmana, for Battles of Yedashe, Szuwa River, Bawlake, Pyinmana and Loikaw
  Topographic Map NE 47-5 Toungoo, for Battles of Taicho, Oktwin, Taungoo and Mawchi 
 Topographic Map NE 47-13 Yamethin, for Battle of Hopong - Taunggyi
 Topographic Map NF 47-14 Mong Pan, for Battle of Loilem. 
 Topographic Map NF 47-6, for Battle of Lashio. 
 Topographic Map NF 47-5 Maymyo, for Battle of Hsipaw-Mogok Highway 
 Japanese Map of the Battle of Toungoo, Axis History Forum
 Axis History Forum: Chinese 200th Division: descriptions of actions needed! Discussion and map of the battle of Toungoo and the actions leading up to it and subsequent battles of the campaign.
 Map of Burma in World War II Showing rails, roads and tracks.
 1944 aerial photograph of Toungoo

Yunnan-Burma Road
Yunnan-Burma Road
1942 in Japan
Yunnan-Burma Road
Military history of Yunnan
1942 in Burma
Yunnan–Burma Road
March 1942 events
April 1942 events
May 1942 events
June 1942 events